Sushila Chanu Pukhrambam (born 25 February 1992) is an Indian field hockey player. A former captain of Indian national team, she has a total of 150 international caps to her credit. Born in Imphal, Manipur, Chanu began playing hockey at the age of eleven, and was soon selected for the national camp.

Chanu rose to prominence in 2013, when she led the junior women's team to a bronze medal finish at the Women's Hockey Junior World Cup at Mönchengladbach. She then made her debut in the senior national team, and was part of the squad that won the bronze medal at the 2014 Asian Games held at Incheon.

Chanu was also praised for her performance at the 2014–15 Men's FIH Hockey World League Semifinals where the Indian team upstaged such higher ranked teams as Japan for a fifth-place finish. Chanu also led the team at Rio Olympics. She plays as a halfback for the team.

Early life
Sushila Chanu was born on 25 February 1992 in Imphal, Manipur, to Pukhrambam Shyamsundar and Pukhrambam Ongbi Lata. Her father is a driver and her mother is a home maker. Her great grandfather, Pukhrambam Angangcha was a successful polo player. Chanu is the second born child in the family; she has an elder sister and a younger brother. Drawn towards sports from a young age, Chanu's interest increased after she accompanied her father to watch a football match during the 1999 National Games hosted in Manipur.

Chanu began playing hockey at the stadium the age of eleven, having been encouraged by her uncle to pick up the sport. He got her enrolled at the Posterior Hockey Academy in Manipur in 2002. Chanu began playing in the Inter-school tournaments, and was subsequently selected for the team participating in Sub-junior and Junior National Hockey Championships, where she caught the attention of the national selection committee. She is employed in the Central Mumbai Railway as a senior ticket collector, and resides in the Railways department's accommodations in Sion, Mumbai.

Career

2008–2013: Junior career and World Cup bronze
Chanu plays as a halfback and has garnered attention for her defensive skills. She made her international debut at the 2008 Women's Hockey Junior Asia Cup, held in Kuala Lumpur, where India won a bronze medal. In 2009, she was dropped out of the team because of fitness issues for a brief period. During that time she graduated from the Madhya Pradesh Hockey Academy, completing her course, and joined the joined Central Railways, Mumbai as Junior Ticket Collector.

Chanu rose to international attention when she led the Indian junior team to a bronze medal finish at the 2013 Junior World Cup at Mönchengladbach, Germany.

2014–present: Senior career, captaincy and Olympic debut
Chanu made her international debut in the senior national field hockey squad after the world cup win, and played a clinical role in the team reaching the semifinals of the 2014–15 Women's FIH Hockey World League held at Antwerp, Belgium. On returning home Chanu along with Anuradha Thokchom and Lily Chanu Mayengbam were praised for their contributions in the Indian women's hockey squad. The three women hockey players were given warm reception in their hometown.

Ahead of the 2016 Rio Olympics, Chanu was named the captain of the national team. She led the team at the four-nation tournament in Australia that was held in May. Prior to the Olympics, she struggled with a major knee injury that had her consider a knee reconstruction surgery. She returned to training after receiving eight weeks of rest and physiotherapy. Under her leadership the Indian women's team played at the Olympics after a gap of 36 years, having qualified in Antwerp. On having qualified for the Olympics she said, "At the London Olympics (2012), we didn’t qualify. The girls saw the opening ceremony at camp in Bhopal. We wanted to get there one day". However, the team finished in last place in their pool with losses against higher-ranked  teams including eventual champions England.

Chanu played her 150th international match in Madrid, Spain during the Indian national team's June 2018 tour of Spain. She said of the feat: "I had always dreamed of representing the country, at least once, in my lifetime, but to have [150 caps] makes me very proud".

Personal life 
Sushila has been described as soft spoken and also works as a junior ticket collector in the Central Mumbai Railway since 2010, a post she got through sports quota. She shares her flat with another hockey player and she shared in an interview that she is able to go home only once a year.

References

External links

Sushila Chanu at Hockey India

1992 births
Living people
People from Imphal
Indian female field hockey players
21st-century Indian women
21st-century Indian people
Asian Games medalists in field hockey
Asian Games bronze medalists for India
Field hockey players at the 2014 Asian Games
Field hockey players at the 2016 Summer Olympics
Field hockey players at the 2020 Summer Olympics
Field hockey players from Manipur
Medalists at the 2014 Asian Games
Olympic field hockey players of India
South Asian Games gold medalists for India
South Asian Games medalists in field hockey
Sportswomen from Manipur
Field hockey players at the 2014 Commonwealth Games
Field hockey players at the 2018 Commonwealth Games
Field hockey players at the 2022 Commonwealth Games
Commonwealth Games bronze medallists for India
Commonwealth Games medallists in field hockey
Medallists at the 2022 Commonwealth Games